Min datter Nelly is a 1955 Danish family film directed by Alice O'Fredericks.

Cast
 Maria Garland - Fru Ingeborg Olsen
 Poul Reichhardt - Dyrlæge Kaare
 Lillian Tillegren - Nelly
 Randi Michelsen - Tante Jessie
 Erni Arneson - Kitty
 Bendt Rothe - Tandlæge Bent Holm
 Else Jarlbak - Kitty's veninde
 Knud Schrøder - Kitty's ven
 Bodil Steen - Lotte Jørgensen
 Karl Stegger - Slagteren

External links

1955 films
1950s Danish-language films
Danish black-and-white films
Films directed by Alice O'Fredericks
Danish drama films
1955 drama films